Events from the year 1999 in Macau.

Incumbents
 Governor (Portugal): Vasco Joaquim Rocha Vieira
 Chief Executive (People's Republic of China): Edmund Ho
 President of the Legislative Assembly (People's Republic of China): Susana Chou

Events

March
 19 March - The opening of Macau Museum of Art in Sé.

December
 5 December - The opening of Taipa Houses–Museum in Taipa.
 11 December - The opening of Fire Services Museum in Santo António.
 20 December
 Transfer of sovereignty over Macau from Portugal to China.
 The Macau Basic Law took effect.
 The establishment of Monetary Authority of Macao.

References

 
Years of the 20th century in Macau
Macau
Macau
1990s in Macau